Athma is a 1993 Indian Tamil language thriller film directed by Pratap Pothen. The film stars Ramki, Rahman, Nassar, Gautami and Kasthuri. It was released on 30 July 1993.

Plot 

Raghu, an atheist archaeologist, and his father went to an isolated village for research. During the research, his father disappears mysteriously and Raghu finds out a strange prophecy: God will come to earth on Purnima day at the Nagakali Amman temple and the people who will submerge completely under the waterfall near the Nagakali Amman temple will be cured of any disease. His colleague Pathma informs her blind friend Divya who is a journalist and the news reaches the public. Pathma is in love with Naveen, who is in the final stages of cancer. Soon, an atheist terrorist group, led by Saravanan, try to destroy the temple. Saravanan has a tragic past: his sister and his brother-in-law were a devotee who was brutally killed by the temple's donor. In the meantime, the police officer Hari, Divya's brother, is charged with eradicating the terrorist group. Pathma believes in this prophecy, so she marries Naveen and takes him to the temple. Divya compels Hari to come with him to restore her sight and he agrees to do so. Few days before the God's arrival, the Nagakali Amman temple is overcrowded. A race against the clock starts.

Cast 

 Ramki as Saravanan / Vignesh
 Rahman as Raghu
 Nassar as Hari
 Gautami as Divya
 Kasthuri as Uma
 Vinodhini as Pathma
 Vaani
 C. R. Vijayakumari as Guhai Amma
 Vijayachander as Raghu's father and Nagalinga Siddhar
 Riyaz Khan as Naveen
 Senthil as Meiyappan
 Vikas Rishi as Vikas
 Vimalraj as Nambiyatri
 Sathyapriya as Naveen's mother
 Sangeetha as Saravanan's sister
 Surekha
 Vennira Aadai Moorthy as Kattabomman
 A. K. Veerasamy as Esakki Muthu
 Chinni Jayanth as Erimalai
 R. S. Shivaji as Shiva
 Subbu Panchu Arunachalam as Anil
 Vaithy
 LIC Narasimhan
 Ramesh Khanna
 Thidir Kanniah
 Thalapathi Dinesh
 Vichithra in a special appearance

Soundtrack 
The soundtrack was composed by Ilaiyaraaja (except "Ninaikkindra Paadhaiyil"), with lyrics written by Vaali.

Reception 
K. Vijiyan of New Straits Times said, "It takes courage to attempt a movie like this, and Prathap's story grabs your attention".

References

External links 
 

1990s Tamil-language films
1993 films
1993 thriller films
Films directed by Pratap Pothen
Films scored by Ilaiyaraaja
Indian thriller films